Nurul Haque Nur is a Bangladeshi activist and politician. He came to prominence in 2018 as a joint-convener of Bangladesh Sadharon Chhatra Odhikar Songrokkhon Parishad, which led the Quota Reform Movement. In 2019, he was elected as the vice president of Dhaka University Central Students' Union (DUCSU). He is currently the convener of the Chatro, Jubo and Probashi Odhikar Porishod.

Early life 
Nurul Huque Nur attended the SSC examination from Gol Abdur Rahim Secondary School, Companir hat 2010 and participated in the HSC examination from Uttara High School and College, Dhaka in 2012.

Activism 

In 2018, Nur became a joint-convenor of Bangladesh Sadharan Chhatra Adhikar Sangrakshan Parishad, which led the Quota Reform Movement. On 30 June 2018, he was beaten in front of the Dhaka University Central Library, with university teachers helping him. Members of Bangladesh Chhatra League were involved in this incident. None of attackers were held responsible for their actions.

In 2019, Nur was elected as the vice president (VP) of DUCSU (Dhaka University Central Students' Union). He frequently led protests against various issues in Bangladesh, among them protests for demanding the fair price of paddy for farmers, demanding the repeal of affiliation of seven college from University of Dhaka, demanding justice for Nusrat, and justice for Abrar.

Apart from national issues, Nur also raised voices for international issues. In particular, he protested the controversial acts CAA and NRC passed by Indian parliament. On 22 December 2019, he gave a rally at the pedestal of the Raju sculpture of Dhaka University in the solidarity of the students protesting against the citizenship amendment law of India and national citizenship registration. At that rally, the leaders of the Muktujuddah Manch (freedom fight stage) a clash when they tried to stop. Many of his fellow activists were beaten to hospital. In protest of this attack, Nur and his organization decided to block a higher study seminar that was organized in support from the Indian Embassy of Bangladesh. However, the attack on Nur and his fellow members continues. The most heinous attack happened on 23 December. On that day, Nur and his fellow activists were attacked by the members of Muktujuddah Manch at the Dhaka University Central Students' Union. Two of his fellow activists were thrown from the roof by the attackers. Many of the activists were taken to ICU; Tuhin Farabi was taken to life support. Nur and his brother were also injured severely. On 24 December 2019, police filed a case against Shahbag police station and arrested the then general secretary of the Muktijuddah Manch Yasin Arafat Turi and the office secretary Mehedi Hasan Shant on charges of involvement in the attack. In the same year, 2019, Nur was attacked seven times in different movements.

References

External links 
 Nur Elected to DUCSU VP, Bdnews24.com

Living people
University of Dhaka alumni
Bangladeshi activists
1991 births
People from Patuakhali district